Yekaterina Yusheva (born 30 April 1973) is a Russian fencer. She competed in the women's foil events at the 2000 and 2004 Summer Olympics.

References

External links
 

1973 births
Living people
Russian female foil fencers
Olympic fencers of Russia
Fencers at the 2000 Summer Olympics
Fencers at the 2004 Summer Olympics
Universiade medalists in fencing
Sportspeople from Rostov-on-Don
Universiade bronze medalists for Russia
21st-century Russian women